Antonio Manuel Rodríguez Cabo (born 19 October 1969), also known as Oti, is a retired Spanish footballer.

Career
Antonio Rodríguez Cabo played for Bundesliga side VfL Bochum in the 1991–92 season, but failed to make a single first team appearance. Almost a decade later he played for Universidad de Las Palmas in the Segunda División, appearing 17 times in the 2000–01 season.

References

1969 births
Living people
Footballers from Puerto de la Cruz
Spanish footballers
Expatriate footballers in Germany
Spanish expatriate footballers
UD Las Palmas players
VfL Bochum players
VfL Bochum II players
CD Mensajero players
Association football defenders